William Alfred Dutt (1870 - 18 September 1939) was an East Anglian writer and naturalist. He was noted as a very knowledgable recluse. For many years he lived in a cottage full of books in Carlton Colville.

Books by William Dutt
Many of his books have been digitised.
 1896: George Borrow in East Anglia, London: D. Nutt
 1899: Highways, Byways and Waterways of East Anglia Lowestoft: Dotesio & Todd with a frontispiece by Edwin A. Cox
 1900; Norfolk, London: Macmillian and Co. reprinted several times
 1901: Highways and Byways in East Anglia, London: Macmillian and Co., reprinted 1914. Illustrated by Joseph Pennell
 1903 The Norfolk Broads London: Methuen & Co.
 1904: The King's homeland, Sandringham and north-west Norfolk London : Published for the Homeland association, by A. and C. Black 
 1904 Suffolk London: Methuen & Co.
 1906 Wild life in East Anglia London, Methuen & Co.
 1907 Some literary associations of East Anglia London: Methuen, 1907), illustrated by Walter Dexter
 1916 Sunlit Norway, nature's wonderland London: B & N Steamship Line and the Norwegian State Railways

References

1870 births
1939 deaths
Writers from Suffolk